Great Britain, represented by the British Olympic Association (BOA), competed at the 1960 Summer Olympics in Rome, Italy. 253 competitors, 206 men and 47 women, took part in 130 events in 17 sports. British athletes have competed in every Summer Olympic Games.

The Rome Games continued Great Britain and Northern Ireland's disappointing run in the Olympics, with British athletes picking up only two gold medals (down from six in 1956).  Overall, they won twenty medals, finishing twelfth.

Medallists

Gold
Don Thompson — Athletics, Men's 50 km Walk
Anita Lonsbrough — Swimming, Women's 200m Breaststroke

Silver
Dorothy Hyman — Athletics, Women's 100 metres
Carole Quinton — Athletics, Women's 80m Hurdles
Dorothy Shirley — Athletics, Women's High Jump
Allan Jay — Fencing, Men's Épée Individual
Allan Jay, Michael Howard, John Pelling, Henry Hoskyns, Raymond Harrison, and Michael Alexander  — Fencing, Men's Épée Team
Natalie Steward — Swimming, Women's 100m Backstroke

Bronze
Peter Radford — Athletics, Men's 100 metres
Peter Radford, David Jones, David Segal, and Neville Whitehead — Athletics, 4 × 100 m Relay
Stan Vickers — Athletics, Men's 20 km Walk
Dorothy Hyman — Athletics, Women's 200 metres
Richard McTaggart — Boxing, Lightweight
Jimmy Lloyd (boxer) — Boxing, Welterweight
William Fisher — Boxing, Light Middleweight
Brian Phelps — Diving, Men's 10m Platform
Elizabeth Ferris — Diving, Women's 3m Springboard
David Broome and Sunsalve — Equestrian, Jumping Individual
Natalie Steward — Swimming, Women's 100m Freestyle
Louis Martin — Weightlifting, Middle-heavyweight

Athletics

Men's Hammer Throw
Mike Ellis
 Qualifying Round — 63.21 m
 Final Round — 54.22 m (→ 15th place)

Women's Discus Throw
 Suzanne Allday
 Qualifying Round — 41.12 m (→ did not advance, 21st place)

Women's Shot Put
 Suzanne Allday
 Qualifying Round — 13.10 m (→ did not advance, 16th place)

Boxing

Canoeing

Cycling

12 male cyclists represented Great Britain in 1960.

Individual road race
 Jim Hinds
 Bill Bradley
 William Holmes
 Ken Laidlaw

Team time trial
 Bill Bradley
 William Holmes
 Jim Hinds
 Ken Laidlaw

Sprint
 Lloyd Binch
 Karl Barton

1000m time trial
 Karl Barton

Tandem
 David Handley
 Eric Thompson

Team pursuit
 Barry Hoban
 Mike Gambrill
 Charlie McCoy
 Joseph McClean

Diving

Equestrian

Fencing

18 fencers, 13 men and 5 women, represented Great Britain in 1960.

Men's foil
 Bill Hoskyns
 Allan Jay
 Ralph Cooperman

Men's team foil
 Bill Hoskyns, Allan Jay, Ralph Cooperman, Angus McKenzie, René Paul

Men's épée
 Allan Jay
 Bill Hoskyns
 John Pelling

Men's team épée
 Allan Jay, Michael Howard, John Pelling, Bill Hoskyns, Raymond Harrison, Michael Alexander

Men's sabre
 Alexander Leckie
 Ralph Cooperman
 Michael Amberg

Men's team sabre
 Ralph Cooperman, Michael Amberg, Alexander Leckie, Michael Straus, Donald Stringer

Women's foil
 Gillian Sheen
 Margaret Stafford
 Mary Glen-Haig

Women's team foil
 Gillian Sheen, Jeannette Bailey, Shirley Netherway, Mary Glen-Haig

Football

Gymnastics

The National Coach to the British Gymnastics team was Frank Turner, who had competed as a gymnast in the 1948, 1952 and 1956 Summer Olympics.

Hockey

Modern pentathlon

Three male pentathletes represented Great Britain in 1960.

Individual
 Patrick Harvey
 Donald Cobley
 Peter Little

Team
 Patrick Harvey
 Donald Cobley
 Peter Little

Rowing

England had 26 male rowers participate in all seven rowing events in 1960.

 Men's single sculls - unplaced
 Sidney Rand

 Men's double sculls - unplaced
 Nicholas Birkmyre
 George Justicz

 Men's coxless pair - unplaced
 Richard Nicholson
 Clive Marshall

 Men's coxed pair - unplaced
 Stewart Farquharson
 Jeffrey Reeves
 Ken Lester (cox)

 Men's coxless four - Fifth
 Christopher Davidge
 Michael Beresford
 Colin Porter
 John Vigurs

 Men's coxed four - unplaced
 Simon Crosse
 Richard Knight
 John M. Russell
 John Tilbury
 Terrence Rosslyn-Smith (cox)

 Men's eight - unplaced
 Richard Bate
 John Chester
 Michael Davis
 Ian Elliott
 Richard Fishlock
 Alexander Lindsay
 Graham Cooper
 Donald Shaw
 Peter Reynolds (cox)

Sailing

Shooting

Ten shooters represented Great Britain in 1960.

25 m pistol
 Tony Clark
 Robert Hassell

50 m pistol
 John Tomlinson
 Frank Dobson

50 m rifle, three positions
 Derek Robinson
 Steffen Cranmer

50 m rifle, prone
 Arthur Skinner
 William Godwin

Trap
 Joe Wheater
 Victor Huthart

Swimming

Weightlifting

Wrestling

See also
 Great Britain at the 1960 Summer Paralympics

References

Nations at the 1960 Summer Olympics
1960
Summer Olympics